The Plains Apache are a small Southern Athabaskan group who live on the Southern Plains of North America, in close association with the linguistically unrelated Kiowa Tribe. Today, they are centered in Southwestern Oklahoma and Northern Texas and are federally recognized as the Apache Tribe of Oklahoma.

Name
The Plains Apache are also known as the Kiowa Apache, Naʼisha, or Na i sha Tindé, meaning "thieves" as the old meaning. However, in more recent times the negative meaning (thief) is beginning to be replaced by just Na i sha. They also used the term Kalth Tindé or  γát dìndé meaning "cedar people" or Bá-ca-yé meaning "whetstone people". To their close allies, the much larger Kiowa tribe, who speak a completely unrelated language, they were known as Semat meaning "stealers." At major tribal events, the Kiowa Apache formed part of the Kiowa tribal "hoop" (ring of tipis). This may explain why the Kiowa named the Kiowa Apache Taugui meaning "sitting outside."

Government
Today the tribe is headquartered in Anadarko, Oklahoma. Their tribal jurisdictional area covers parts of Caddo, Comanche, Cotton, Greer, Jackson, Kiowa, Tillman and Harmon Counties in Oklahoma. Their current Tribal Chairman is Durell Cooper III.

Tribal members must have a minimum blood quantum of 1/8 Plains Apache descent and at least 1/8 total Indian blood to enroll in the tribe.

Economic development
The Apache Tribe has previously owned and operated casinos. The Apache, "Golden Eagle Casino" and "Silver Buffalo Casino" were closed in July 2013. They also issue their own tribal license plates.

History

In the early 18th century, the Plains Apache lived around the upper Missouri River and were closely connected to the Kiowa people. They were ethnically different and spoke a different language. Plains Apache entered this alliance with the Kiowa for mutual protection against hostile tribes.

It is recorded that many Kiowa Apache did not learn the Kiowa language, preferring to communicate with their allies using the sophisticated Plains Indian Sign Language, at which the Kiowa were past masters (having probably devised much of the system).

Even before contact with Europeans, their numbers were never large, and in 1780 their population was estimated at 400.

The Kiowa Apache and Kiowa had migrated into the Southern Plains sometime around 1800. By the Treaty of Medicine Lodge in 1867 the Kiowa and Kiowa Apache settled in Western Oklahoma and Kansas. They were forced to move south of the Washita River to the Red River and Western Oklahoma with the Comanche and the Kiowa. The reservation period lasted from 1868 to 1906. The transition from the free life of Plains people to a restricted life of the reservation was more difficult for some families than others. The 1890 Census showed 1,598 Comanche at the Fort Sill reservation, which they shared with 1,140 Kiowa and 326 Kiowa Apache.

Some groups of Plains Apache refused to settle on reservations and were involved in Kiowa and Comanche uprisings, most notably the First Battle of Adobe Walls which was the largest battle of the Indian Wars. It would be the last battle in which the Natives repelled the US Army in the Southern Plains.

In 1966, the tribe organized a business committee and regained federal recognition.

Social organization
The Kiowa Apache social organization is split into numerous extended families (kustcrae), who camped together (for hunting, gathering) as local groups (gonka). The next level was the division or band, a grouping of a number of gonkas (who would come together, for mutual protection, especially in time of war).

In pre-reservation times there were at least four local groups or gonkas who frequently joined together for warring neighbouring tribes and settlements.

Dismal River culture
The Apache are linked to the Dismal River culture of the western Plains, generally attributed to the Paloma and Cuartelejo Apaches.  Jicarilla Apache pottery has also been found in some of the Dismal River complex sites. Some of the people of the Dismal River culture joined the Kiowa Apache in the Black Hills of South Dakota. Due to pressure from the Comanche from the west and Pawnee and French from the east, the Kiowa and remaining people of Dismal River culture migrated south where they later joined the Lipan Apache and Jicarilla Apache nations.

Language

The Kiowa Apache language is a member of the Southern Athabaskan language family, a division of the Na-Dene languages. The Plains Apache language, also referred to as Kiowa Apache, was the most divergent member of the subfamily. While three people spoke the language in 2006, the last fluent speaker died in 2008.

Historical chiefs 

 Gonkon (Gonkan - "Stays in Tipi" or "Defends His Tipi", also known as "Apache John"). A shortened form of his full name Gon-kon-chey-has-tay-yah (Man Over His Camp).
 Tsayaditl-ti (Ta-Ka-I-Tai-Di or Da-Kana-Dit-Ta-I - "White Man", ca. *1830 - ca. †1900)
 Koon-Ka-Zachey (Kootz-Zah). A shortened form of his full name Gon-kon-chey-has-tay-yah (Man Over His Camp).
 Essa-queta (better known as Pacer or Peso, derived from Pay-Sus, ca. *? - † 1875, Pacer was the leader of the Kiowa Apace tribe. Actually, Pacer was part of the peace faction and kept the main group of Kiowa Apaches on the reservation during the Red River War of 1874-75)
 Si-tah-le ("Poor Wolf")
 Oh-ah-te-kah ("Poor Bear")
 Ah-zaah ("Prairie Wolf")

Notable tribal members 
Vanessa Jennings, Plains Apache/Kiowa/Pima beadworker and regalia-maker

See also
 Apache
 Kiowa
 Classification of Indigenous peoples of the Americas

Notes

References
 Pritzker, Barry M. A Native American Encyclopedia: History, Culture, and Peoples. Oxford: Oxford University Press, 2000. .

Bibliography
Beatty, John. 1974. Kiowa-Apache Music and Dance. Occasional Publications in Anthropology: Ethnology Series. Number 31. Greeley, CO: Northern Colorado UP.
Bittle, William. 1954. “The Peyote Ritual of the Kiowa Apache.” Oklahoma Anthropological Society. 2: 69-79.
__. 1962. “The Manatidie: A Focus for Kiowa Apache Tribal Identity.” Plains Anthropologist. 7(17): 152-163.
__. 1963. “Kiowa-Apache.” In Studies in the Athapaskan Languages. (Ed. Hoijer, Harry). University of California Studies in Linguistics vol. 29. Berkeley: California UP. 76-101.
__. 1964. “Six Kiowa Apache Tales.” Oklahoma Papers in Anthropology. 5:8-12.
__. 1971. “A Brief History of the Kiowa Apache.” Oklahoma Papers in Anthropology. 12(1): 1-34.
__. 1979. “Kiowa Apache Raiding Behavior.” Oklahoma Papers in Anthropology. 20(2): 33-47.
Brant, Charles S. 1949. “The cultural position of the Kiowa-Apache.” Southwestern Journal of Anthropology. 5(1): 56-61.
Brant, Charles S. 1950. “Peyotism among the Kiowa-Apache and Neighboring Tribes.” Southwestern Journal of Anthropology. 6(2): 212-222.
Brant, Charles S. 1953.  “Kiowa-Apache Culture History: Some Further Observations.” Southwestern Journal of Anthropology. 9(2): 195-202.
Brant, Charles S. 1969. Jim Whitewolf: The Life of a Kiowa Apache. New York: Dover Publications.
Jordan, Julia A. 2008 Plains Apache Ethnobotany. University of Oklahoma Press.
McAllister, J. Gilbert. 1937. “Kiowa-Apache Social Organization.” In Social Anthropology of North American Tribes. (ed. Eggan, Fred). Chicago: Chicago UP.99-169.
___.1949. “Kiowa Apache Tales.” In The Sky is My Tipi. (ed. Boatright, Mody). Dallas: SMU Press. 1-141.
___.1970. Dävéko: Kiowa-Apache Medicine Man. Austin: Bulletin of the Texas Memorial Museum, No. 17.
Meadows, William C. 1999. Kiowa, Apache, and Comanche Military Societies. University of Texas Press, Austin.
 Opler, Morris E. (1969). Western Apache and Kiowa Apache materials relating to ceremonial payment. Ethnology, 8 (1), 122-124.
 Opler, Morris E; & Bittle, William E. (1961). The death practices and eschatology of the Kiowa Apache. Southwestern Journal of Anthropology, 17 (4), 383-394.
 Schweinfurth, Kay Parker. (2002). Prayer on top of the earth: The spiritual universe of the Plains Apaches. Boulder: University Press of Colorado.

External links
 Encyclopedia of Oklahoma History and Culture - Apache Tribe of Oklahoma (Kiowa-Apache)
 Kiowa Comanche Apache IT, Kiowa Comanche Apache Indian Territory Project

Apache tribes
Native American tribes in Oklahoma
Federally recognized tribes in the United States